Lynch Shipbuilding was a wooden shipbuilding company in San Diego, California. To support the World War II demand for ships, Lynch Shipbuilding built US Navy rescue tugs and coastal cargo ships. Lynch Shipbuilding yard was started in the 1930s.  Lynch was in the lumber business at the time also. In 1952 the yard was sold to Martinolich Shipbuilding Company, as Martinolich Shipbuilding San Diego. Martinolich's main shipyard was in Dockton, Washington. John A. Martinolich died in 1960. Martinolich's sons operated boatyards from 1940s to 1970 in Tacoma and San Diego also. Martinolich sold the San Diego shipyard in 1957 to National Steel and Shipbuilding Company which is at the current site, 1400 South 28th Street, San Diego.

Notable ships
 Six APc-1-class small coastal transports. Displacement of 100 tons lite, 258 tons full, a length 103 feet, a beam of 21 feet, a draft of 9 feet, a top speed of 10 knots. Crew of 3 officers and 22 enlisted with a troop transport of 66 troops. Armed four Oerlikon 20 mm cannons. Power one 400shp Atlas 6HM2124 Diesel engine, to a Snow and Knobstedt single reduction gear, to a single propeller with 400shp 
 Seven ATR-1-class rescue tug with wood hull. Displacement of 852 tons lite, 1,315 tons full, a length of 165 feet, a beam of 33 feet, a draft of 16 feet, top speed of 12.2kts. Armed with one 3-inch/50-caliber gun, two Oerlikon 20 mm cannons. A crew of 5 officers and 47 enlisted. Power one Prescott Co. vertical triple-expansion reciprocating steam engine, with two Foster Wheeler "D"-type boilers 200psi to a single propeller with 1,600shp.

Lynch Shipbuilding

Martinolich Shipbuilding San Diego

See also
California during World War II
Maritime history of California
Wooden boats of World War 2

References

American Theater of World War II
1940s in California
American boat builders